Jacob "Jake" Rufe (born January 22, 1996) is an American soccer player who most recently played as a defender for Birmingham Legion in the USL Championship.

Career

College & Amateur
Rufe began playing college soccer at Indiana University in 2014, but didn't make an appearances for the Hoosiers during his two seasons due to injury. In 2016, Rufe transferred to Western Michigan University, where he played for three seasons, scoring 2 goals and tallying 4 assists in 55 appearances.

During college, Rufe also played with NPSL side AFC Ann Arbor in both 2016 and 2017. In 2018, Rufe played in the USL PDL with Michigan Bucks.

After college, Rufe returned to play with AFC Ann Abor during their 2019 season.

Professional
In September 2019, Rufe signed for NISA side Stumptown Athletic ahead of the league's inaugural season.

In May 2020, Rufe moved to USL Championship side Birmingham Legion.

References

External links
 Profile at Indiana University Athletics
 Profile at Western Michigan University Athletics
 Stumptown Athletic profile

1996 births
Living people
American soccer players
Soccer players from Alabama
Association football midfielders
Indiana Hoosiers men's soccer players
Western Michigan Broncos men's soccer players
AFC Ann Arbor players
Flint City Bucks players
Stumptown AC players
Birmingham Legion FC players
National Premier Soccer League players
USL League Two players
National Independent Soccer Association players
Sportspeople from Huntsville, Alabama
USL Championship players